Microstelma is a genus of minute sea snails, marine gastropod mollusks or micromollusks in the family Zebinidae.

Species
Species within the genus Microstelma include:
 † Microstelma arescum (Woodring, 1928)  
 Microstelma canaliculatum (E. A. Smith, 1890)
 Microstelma columbella (Dall, 1881)
 Microstelma concinna A. Adams, 1870
 Microstelma daedalum A. Adams, 1863
 Microstelma gabbi (Dall, 1889)
 Microstelma glabratum (A. Adams, 1878)
 Microstelma japonicum (A. Adams, 1867)
 Microstelma lutaoi Chang & Wu, 2004
  † Microstelma melanoides (Gabb, 1873)
 Microstelma oshikatai Lan, 2003
 Microstelma semistriatum (A. Adams, 1878)
 Microstelma vestale (Rehder, 1943)
Species brought into synonymy
 Microstelma daedala [sic]: synonym of Microstelma daedalum A. Adams, 1863
 Microstelma egregia (Dall, 1889): synonym of Costaclis egregia (Dall, 1889)
 Microstelma flava Okutani, 1964: synonym of Punctulum flavum (Okutani, 1964)
 Microstelma formosa Chang & Wu, 2004: synonym of Rissoina formosa (Chang & Wu, 2004)
 Microstelma glabrata [sic]: synonym of Microstelma glabratum (A. Adams, 1878)
 Microstelma japonicus [sic]: synonym of Microstelma japonicum (A. Adams, 1867)
 Microstelma semistriata [sic]: synonym of Microstelma semistriatum (A. Adams, 1878)

References

 Ponder W. F. (1985) A review of the genera of the Rissoidae (Mollusca: Mesogastropoda: Rissoacea). Records of the Australian Museum supplement 4: 1-221 
 Spencer, H.G., Marshall, B.A. & Willan, R.C. 2009 Recent Mollusca. pp 196–219 in: Gordon, D.P. (Ed.), The New Zealand inventory of biodiversity. 1. Kingdom Animalia: Radiata, Lophotrochozoa, Deuterostomia. Canterbury University Press, Christchurch

Zebinidae
Gastropod genera